Copley may refer to:

People 
 Copley (surname)

Places 
Australia
 Copley, South Australia

England
 Copley, County Durham
 Copley, Greater Manchester, formerly in Cheshire
 Copley Academy, in that area
 Copley, West Yorkshire

Wales
 Copley, Swansea

United States of America
 Copley Place, an indoor shopping mall in Boston
 Copley Square in Boston
 Copley (MBTA station), at that square
 Fairmont Copley Plaza Hotel in Boston on Copley Square
 Copley, Ohio
 Coplay, Pennsylvania
 Copley, West Virginia

Other uses 
 Copley Medal, a scientific award granted by the Royal Society of London
 Copley Press, a California-based newspaper publisher
 Copley (crater), a crater on Mercury